Retinia pseudotsugaicola is a species of moth of the family Tortricidae. It is found in Yunnan, China.

The larvae feed on Pseudotsuga sinensis.

References

Moths described in 2001
Eucosmini